Ābols (Old orthography: Ahbol; feminine: Ābola) is a Latvian surname, derived from the Latvian word for "apple". Individuals with the surname include:

Armands Ābols (born 1973), Latvian classical pianist
Artis Ābols (born 1973), Latvian ice hockey player and coach

Latvian-language masculine surnames